Rings of Saturn is the sixth studio album by American deathcore band Rings of Saturn. It was self-released by the band on June 15, 2022. The album was self-produced by the band.

Background
On April 30, 2021, the band announced that they had parted ways with Nuclear Blast after guitarist Lucas Mann began threatening the label by saying he'd make public statements "'condemning Nuclear Blast in the strongest terms possible' if the label does not give in to his baseless demands." On May 14, the band announced that vocalist Ian Bearer departed from the band for unknown reasons and continue as an instrumental group.

Track listing

Personnel
Credits adapted from Discogs.

Rings of Saturn
 Lucas Mann – lead guitar, bass, keyboards, programming, synthesizers, arranging
 Joel Omans – rhythm guitar, bass

Additional personnel
 Rings of Saturn – production
 Sammy Morales – production, mixing, mastering
 Virginia Leo – production, piano
 Jake Bratrude – beats, arranging

References

2022 albums
Rings of Saturn (band) albums